Tunart is a locality situated on the Tarrango-Tunart Road in the Sunraysia region. The place by road, is situated about 10 kilometres south from Karween and 15 kilometres west from Kurnwill.

References